Chefna is a river of Belgium. 
It springs in Ville-au-bois and flows for  through the province of Liège, before emptying into the Amblève.

Around 1802, several farmers started looking for gold in the river and on the right bank the pits of a primitive goldmine can be found, although they have been mostly overgrown.

References

External links 

Rivers of the Ardennes (Belgium)
Rivers of Belgium
Rivers of Liège Province